Aksdal is the administrative centre of Tysvær municipality, Norway. The village is located on the northern shore of the large lake Aksdalsvatnet, at the junction of the European route E134 and European route E39 highways. Aksdal Church is located in Aksdal.

References

Villages in Rogaland
Tysvær